Morgan Brooke Marlborough (born December 3, 1990) is an American soccer player. She previously  played for the Boston Breakers and FC Kansas City of the National Women's Soccer League (NWSL) and Glasgow City F.C. in the Scottish Women's Premier League.

Career 

Marlborough played for the Cornhuskers at the University of Nebraska–Lincoln and then for the Santa Clara Broncos.

She was selected by FC Kansas City with the 12th pick in the 2014 NWSL College Draft. Marlborough went on loan to Glasgow City F.C. on September 8, 2014.

She was traded to the Boston Breakers by FC Kansas City on October 27, 2014.

On May 3, 2016, she was waived by the Breakers.

International career
Marlborough was invited to the U.S. U-17 National Team Camp in 2007. In 2010, she played for the U.S. U-20 Women's National Team in the CONCACAF World Cup qualifiers.

She was a member of the U-23 U.S. Women's National Team.  At the 2012 Four Nations Tournament she scored one goal and tallied one to assist in 5–0 win over Norway that gave the U.S. U-23s the tournament championship. In March 2013, she played with the U.S. U-23s at the Four Nations Tournament in La Manga, Spain where she scored two goals in a 6–0 win over Sweden. .

Honours

FC Kansas City
Winner
 National Women's Soccer League: 2014

Glasgow City F.C.
Winner
Scottish Women's Premier League: 2014
Scottish Women's Cup: 2014

References

External links 
 
 Boston Breakers player profile
 Cornhuskers player profile 
 Profile at soccerdonna.de 

1990 births
Living people
American women's soccer players
National Women's Soccer League players
Boston Breakers players
FC Kansas City players
Glasgow City F.C. players
Nebraska Cornhuskers women's soccer players
Santa Clara Broncos women's soccer players
American expatriate women's soccer players
Expatriate women's footballers in Scotland
American expatriate sportspeople in Scotland
FC Kansas City draft picks
Women's association football forwards
United States women's under-20 international soccer players